This is list of state visits by King Birendra (28 December 1945 – 1 June 2001) of Nepal during his regime.

Africa

Egypt
Birendra and Aishwarya paid a state visit to Egypt at the invitation of President Anwar El Sadat in February 1981.

America

United States
Birendra visited the USA between 10 and 13 December 1983. He also travelled to Orlando, Dallas, New York City, and Boston. In the same trip, he had a private visit to Atlanta, San Francisco, and Honolulu.

Cuba
In 1979, Birendra and Aishwarya made an official visit to Havana, Cuba to participate in 6th summit of Non Alliance Movement.

Asia

Australia

Birendra and Aishwarya made a state visit to Australia on 1-8 September 1985. They were invited by the Governor-General Sir Ninian Stephen and Lady Stephen.

China
In December 1973, a state visit to Peking was made.
In March 2000, Birendra met Premier Zhu in China. The following year in 2001 Premier Zhu visited Nepal and met Birendra.

India

1977 Birendra met with Indian Prime Minister Morarji Desai, and other ministers. He also visited India in 
1999

Japan
In 1978, Birendra and Aishwarya went Japan for a state visit.

Saudi Arabia
On 1999, Birendra and Aishwarya visited Saudi Arabia.

Europe

Britain
Birendra and queen Aishwarya had a state visit to Britain on 18-21 November 1980. Queen of Britain organized state banquet hosted by the Queen.

Denmark
On October 1989, Birendra and Aishwarya made a state visit to Denmark. While returning they made an unofficial visit to France.

Germany
On 1986, Birendra and Aishwarya made state visit to Germany. They also went to Salzburg, Austria unofficially on the same trip. In 25-30 November 1996, the German President Roman Herzog paid state visit to Nepal on the invitation of Birendra.

Russia/USSR
In 1976, Birendra went on a state visit to USSR.

References

History of Nepal